Plocamus is a genus of flower weevils in the beetle family Curculionidae. There are about nine described species in Plocamus.

Species
These nine species belong to the genus Plocamus:
 Plocamus albofasciatus Hustache, 1950
 Plocamus apicalis Hustache, 1950
 Plocamus bellus Hustache, 1950
 Plocamus brevisetis Hustache, 1950
 Plocamus clavisetis Champion & G.C., 1908
 Plocamus echidna (LeConte, 1876) (porcupine weevil)
 Plocamus hispidulus LeConte, 1876
 Plocamus hystrix Champion & G.C., 1908
 Plocamus variegatus Hustache, 1950

References

Further reading

 
 
 

Baridinae
Articles created by Qbugbot